is a male Japanese music group consisting of four members, Uratanuki, Shima, Tonari no Sakata (Aho no Sakata) and Senra. The group's name was created from a combination of the members' names. They are mainly active on YouTube.

The band formed in 2013; they began by posting singing videos on video sites. In 2015, they made their CD debut with the release of the mini album Hajimari no Aizu (はじまりの合図). In 2016, they released the album Cruise Ticket from music label JVCKenwood Victor Entertainment and made a major debut. The 5th (3rd major) album V-enus released in 2018, The albums both topped the Oricon and Billboard Japan  music charts. In 2019, they won a gold disc with the album $HUFFLE, and their newest release L∞VE (2021) topped the Oricon a few days after its initial release.

Members 

  – Leader group, Vocalist, Voice acting
  – Vocalist, Voice acting
  – Vocalist, Voice acting
  – Vocalist

Discography

Albums

Doujin albums

Singles

DVD&Blu-ray

TV anime series 
They received their own short anime series titled, Urashima Sakata sen no nichijō (浦島坂田船の日常, lit. Everyday of Urashimasakatasen) which was broadcast on Tokyo MX. The anime is an original story about Urashimasakatasen's youth following their transfer into a high school. Each member voices their own character.

References

External links 

 
 Official Website

Japanese musical groups
Musical groups established in 2013
Musical quartets
Utaite
2013 establishments in Japan